Jakob Christoph Heer (17 July 1859, Winterthur - 20 August 1925, Zürich) was a Swiss novelist and travel writer.

Life and career 
His father, Christoph (1833-1913), was a fitter who served in the Winterthur city government. In 1879, he was awarded a teaching certificate from the Kantonsschule Küsnacht. He originally worked as a "vicar" (substitute teacher) in Glattfelden then, in 1882, found a permanent position in Dürnten. His first book, Holidays on the Adriatic, was published in 1888. He became the features editor for the Neue Zürcher Zeitung in 1892. The following year, he married Emma Karoline Gossweiler (1859-1936), daughter of Adolf Gossweiler, an engineer. From 1899 to 1902, he was an editor for Die Gartenlaube. After 1902, he worked as a freelance writer.

Works 
Heer's novels include:

 1898, An heiligen Wassern
 1900, Der König der Bernina
 1901, Felix Notvest
 1902, Joggeli
 1905, Der Wetterwart
 1908, Laubgewind
 1918, Heinrichs Romfahrt
 1920, Nick Tappoli
 1922, Tobias Heider

Adaptations 
His two best known novels have each been adapted into movies twice.

Der König der Bernina (The King of Bernina) was originally filmed in the United States in 1929 (directed by Ernst Lubitsch and starring John Barrymore), under the title Eternal Love.

An heiligen Wassern (On Holy Waters) was filmed in Germany in 1932 by Erich Waschneck, under the title Stürzende Wasser (Sacred Water), and again in 1960 by the Swiss director, Alfred Weidenmann (An Heiligen Wassern).

Memorials 
On a hill in Winterthur, there is a "Gedenkstein" (commemorative stone), donated by the city of Poschiavo. In Der König der Bernina the main character, Markus Paltram, is inspired by a hunter and gunsmith named , who was from that area. Heer is buried nearby. He had originally wanted to be buried in another location closer to town but, by the time he died, a slaughterhouse was being built near there.

A second stone was placed in Pontresina, on a spot with a view of the Piz Bernina.

References

Further reading

External links 

 
 
 

1859 births
1925 deaths
Swiss writers
Swiss novelists
Swiss novels adapted into films
19th-century travel writers
Swiss travel writers
Swiss editors
People from Winterthur